Xuanzhou Wu is the western Wu Chinese language, spoken in and around Xuancheng, Anhui province. The language has declined since the Taiping Rebellion, with an influx of Mandarin-speaking immigrants from north of the Yangtze River.

Dialects 
Xuancheng dialect is representative. 
Xuancheng
Tong–Jing
Tongling dialect
Jing County dialect
Fanchang dialect
 etc.
Shi–Ling
 Shitai dialect
 Lingyang dialect
 etc.
Tai–Gao
Taiping dialect
Gaochun dialect
 etc.

References 

Wu Chinese